Shawallah Rashid (born 15 April 1993) is a Singaporean netball player who represents Singapore internationally and plays in the positions of center, wing attack or wing defense. She was part of the Singaporean squad at the 2019 Netball World Cup, which was also her first World Cup appearance.

References 

1993 births
Living people
Singaporean netball players
2019 Netball World Cup players
21st-century Singaporean women